Meudon Castle, also known as the Royal Castle of Meudon or Imperial Palace of Meudon, is a French castle located in Meudon in the Hauts-de-Seine department. At the edge of a wooded plateau, the castle offers views of Paris and the Seine, as well as of the Chalais valley. Located between Paris and Versailles, in the heart of a hunting reserve, the castle has an ideal topography for large gardens. It had many successive owners from the Renaissance until the fall of the Second French Empire. It should not be confused with the Bellevue Castle, also located in Meudon.

Famous past residents include: Anne de Pisseleu d'Heilly, Duchess of Étampes; the Cardinal of Lorraine, Abel Servien; François Michel Le Tellier, Marquis of Louvois and Louis, Grand Dauphin, also known as Monseigneur, who linked the Chaville Castle to Meudon Castle. The Château-Vieux (Old Castle) burned down in 1795 and was rebuilt as the Château-Neuf (New Castle), which in turn burned down in 1871. Demolition was considered, but most of the castle was preserved and became an observatory with an astronomical telescope in 1878 and was then attached to the Observatory of Paris in 1927.

The castle of Meudon has been classified as a historical monument since 12 April, 1972.  in the Chalais-Meudon park has been classified as an historical monument since 4 June 2000. It was the first storage facility for aerostats in the world and is one of the few still standing.

History

"There are few citizen architects or enlightened foreigners who would have wished, as we did, that the expenditures incurred at Versailles had been made at Meudon, as the most beautiful place in the world, both in its layout and in its location. "
- , Cours d'Architecture ..., 1773, volume 4, p. 132.

Meudon at the end of the Middle Ages

Lords of Meudon (1200s–1413) 
There is little information on the origin of the castle, but it was certainly a small castle with an unknown floor plan. Many records do, however, exist of 12th-century lords named "Meudon" as well as a mention of a "manor of the Meudon vale" in the 14th century. Marie-Thérèse Herlédan published an account of this period in her book Meudon, Avant le Roy (Meudon Before the King). Many Meudons held positions in court, such as Robert de Meudon, the Grand Panetier of France under King Philip the Fair. His title was mentioned in a deed in 1305.

Augustin Isbarre (1413–1425) 
On 17 July 1413, Jean de Montrevel, known as the Hermit, lord of La Faye, chamberlain of the king and husband of Jeanne de Gaillonnel, holder of the castle's fief, sold the castle with his wife's consent to the wealthy Augustin Isbarre, banker and jeweller. In 1422, Isbarre, whose family had performed financial services for the royal family, was appointed cupbearer to the king.

Renaissance

The Sanguin family and the Duchesse d'Étampes (1426–1552) 

He was previously associated with the former owner, Augustin Isbarre, a provost of the merchants of Paris from 1429 to 1431. It seems that he had built a manor on the site of the old castle. He died in Paris on 14 February 1441.

Jean Sanguin, known as the "Bastard of Sanguin", inherited the seigniory of his father; he died in Paris on 13 November 1468. He had several children, including Antoine Sanguin, who inherited the fief and became lord of Meudon. Antoine later married Marie Simon and died on 18 October 1500.

The manor was demolished in 1520 by Antoine Sanguin, known as the Cardinal de Meudon, son of the previous Cardinal de Meudon, who built a square corps de logis of brick and stone with a loft floor over a ground floor that had ornamented skylights. It was adorned in the Italian style with pilasters, bands and stone framing. The layout of the castle supposedly influenced that of the Château du Grand Jardin, in Joinville, a property of the de Guise family. Antoine Sanguin gave the castle to his niece Anne of Pisseleu, also called the Duchess of Étampes, on 5 September 1527. She had become the mistress of François I, and almost the de facto queen of France. To better accommodate his mistress, François financed an addition of two square pavilions on either side of the initial body and two wings that ended with identical pavilions. These extensions mirrored the style of the main building. In the style of the Château d'Écouen, corbelled corner turrets were also added to the pavilions. The structure was similar to the works undertaken at the château at Marchais, then owned by Nicolas de Longueval, Count of Bossut and Superintendent of Finance under Francois I, governor of Champagne and Brie and a member of the inner circle of the Duchess of Étampes. The same still-unknown architect must also have headed the expansion of Meudon and Marchais, as well as those of the neighbouring castle in Sissonne, which are all in the same style. A triumphal arch was also built into the center of the enclosure wall, serving as a majestic entrance to the courtyard.

Francis I of France stayed in Meudon from 11 July to 5 August 1537. He stayed there many times until his death in 1547.

Cardinal of Lorraine and the de Guises (1552–1654) 

Upon the death of Francis I, Anne de Pisseleu had to sell the Meudon estate in 1552 to Charles de Guise, Cardinal of Lorraine. This ended the Sanguins' presence at Meudon, which had lasted more than a century. The former favourite withdrew to the Château d'Heilly, where she died in September 1580.

The cardinal then renovated the castle, drawing inspiration from the Italian architectural style, which he had discovered during his travels to Rome. A letter written on 28 December 1552, addressed to his sister-in-law Anna d'Este, says: "I have been at Meudon while I was in Paris, and I beg to assure you that the house is finished ... there are no more beautiful houses in this kingdom."

The cardinal had the wings on the courtyard side of the gallery surmounted by a terrace, based on drawings by Francesco Primaticcio. The interiors were decorated with scenes from the Council of Trent, in which the cardinal had actively participated, probably in the style being practised in Italy at that time by Taddeo and Federigo Zuccaro. Terraced gardens and an orangerie were created around small buildings, including a small fantasy palace dedicated to nymphs and muses, the famous "Grotto of Meudon," also based on drawings by Primaticcio between 1552 and 1560, and decorations with compositions by the artist. It forms a small palace under a platform of arcades, sheltered from view by a hill that visually separates it from the castle, as shown on a print by Israel Silvestre representing the grotto. The latter is actually made up of three pavilions backing onto the slope, blending Italian and French styles. The central pavilion sheltered the grotto, decorated with mosaics, shells, corals and maiolica, and whose prime contractor was Primaticcio himself. On the first floor of the central pavilion, antiques were displayed in a large salon. Historian Henri Sauval wrote that the Diana of Versailles had been brought from Italy and placed in the castle of Meudon, but recent research seems to prove otherwise. This grotto enjoyed immediate success and was praised by Pierre de Ronsard in his "Chant pastoral sur les noces de Charles, duc de Lorraine et Madame Claude, fille du roi" (a pastoral song on the Wedding of Charles, Duke of Lorraine and Madame Claude, daughter of the king).

In 1568, Giorgio Vasari was enthusiastic about the grotto, whose repute had reached as far as Italy. At Meudon, for the Cardinal of Lorraine, Primaticcio executed many decorations in his great palace called La Grotte (the grotto), of so extraordinary an amplitude that it recalls the baths of antiquity, because of the infinite number and the size of its galleries, staircases, public and private apartments. The construction of this cave was spread out over time, starting with the construction of the grotto itself and the two ramps of the staircase (circa 1552–1555), and then, in a second stage, the two pavilions (1559). The lower cryptoportico was then built in a third phase.

At the death of the Cardinal of Lorraine in 1574, the castle remained the property of the family of Guise, who held it as one of their fiefs, along with the castle of Joinville, Haute-Marne.

Meudon was plundered during the Wars of Religion. And it was at Meudon that the future Henri IV (Henry of Navarre) learned of the assassination of Henry III of France on 1 August 1589 from Jacques Clément. Henry of Navarre went the very same day to see the wounded king in nearby Saint-Cloud. The king reassured him about his state of health. Henri went back to Meudon. Maximilien de Bethune, Duke of Sully, who accompanied him, lodged at "Sauvat", a house in the village. The next day, the king's condition worsened and he died at Saint-Cloud. Henry of Navarre became King of France, the first Bourbon king.

Henri de Guise barely had the time to visit Meudon. He was assassinated in 1588. Meudon became one of the seats of the League. On July 24, 1605, the marriage of Francois de Bourbon, Prince of Conti (1558–1614) and Louise Marguerite de Lorraine took place in the chapel of the chateau. In 1618, the Duke of Lorraine tasked his architect, Gabriel Soulignac, with modifying the castle and extending the gardens. Other work was carried out by Soulignac in 1623, with the construction of a terrace and a staircase near the grotto.

In 1639, Jacques Dubreuil boasted of Meudon's stairs and turrets: "The garden is moderately large, made of flower beds, borders, open alleyways, surrounded by alleys covered with beautiful trees, with balusters." In 1641, the painter Nicolas Poussin visited Meudon, no doubt attracted by the famous decorations of Primaticcio. Above all, 18 May 1643, the union of Gaston d'Orléans, brother of Louis XIII with Marguerite of Lorraine, was renewed in the chapel of the castle, with the blessing of the Archbishop of Paris.

The domain was plundered under the Fronde, since the Lorraine princes who owned Meudon had taken the side of the rebellion against royal authority. Thus, beginning in 1649, the Grand Condé, at the head of the Royal Army, seized Charenton, Saint-Denis, Saint-Cloud and Meudon.

Grand Siècle

Abel Servien and the marquis de Sablé (1654–1679) 
Meudon, in poor condition, was then bought on 12 September 1654 by Abel Servien, Superintendent of Finances, who took the title of Baron de Meudon. As soon as the purchase was made, Servien had extensive renovation work done by the architect Louis Le Vau. He was at the peak of his career, and felt that Meudon should reflect this power. In Paris, Servien lived at the Hôtel de la Roche-Guyon near the Palais-Royal at least from 1651 to 1659. The castle was then richly furnished and decorated. The central foredeck was replaced by an octagonal pavilion, surmounted by a high roof shaped like a truncated pyramid. In the center of the pavilion was a large double spiral staircase. A large staircase, adorned with twelve columns of marble monoliths, precedes it. The first floor housed a large cupolaed salon, opening onto the gardens, similar to the one built at the time by Nicholas Fouquet at the chateau of Vaux-le-Vicomte. He was the Superintendent of Finance with Servien and under the authority of Servien, who was older than he was. Servien had a large terrace built in the forecourt in order to clear the view of the castle, thereby engulfing nearly a third of the village of Meudon, which he moved elsewhere.

On the garden side, he built a monumental orangerie, still preserved today. He enlarged the park, which had existed since at least the Duchesse d'Étampes. Through many land purchases, he managed to put through a "Grande Perspective" south of the castle, featuring basins and ponds, including those of Chalais. Letters patent dated 31 August 1657 bear "permission to extend the park of Meudon, enclose it in walls, even though the acquired inheritances are in the neighborhood of the pleasures of His Majesty," or in other words, of the neighboring Palace of Versailles.

When Queen Christine of Sweden came to France, she offered Servien a bronze by Adrian de Vries, Mercury Abducting Psyche, now in the Louvre. Servien had this bronze placed at the end of the flowerbed, just above his new orangery.

Servien died on 17 February 1659 at Meudon itself in his apartment on the ground floor after having spent a true fortune on Meudon, which was still under construction.

His son, marquess of Sablé and protector of Jean de La Fontaine, kept the estate for twenty years. On 2 August 1665, Gian Lorenzo Bernini visited Meudon.

Financial constraints finally forced Louis-Francois Servien to sell Meudon to François Lemoine de Louvois in 1679. Already, a year earlier in 1678, members of the Académie Royale d'Architecture visited Meudon, and found that "what was renovated on the garden side of the castle in the days of M. Servien is very ruined, particularly the cornice of the central pavilion," (P.V.I. 193).

Louvois and his wife, Anne de Souvré (1679–1695) 

For the powerful minister, who called himself "M. de Chaville" in his youth, the site of Meudon was ideal. It was near both Versailles and the Chateau of Chaville, where the family property was located. It was rebuilt by his father, Michel Le Tellier. Louvois obtained the superintendence for the buildings in 1683, then embarked on a series of grandiose rearrangements. He enriched the façade of the chateau with busts and balconies on columns of gray marble. He sumptuously redecorated the whole interior. He had woodwork installed in 1684. Above the doors were floral paintings in the style of Jean-Baptiste Monnoyer. A cabinet displayed miniatures of the groves of Versailles painted by Jean Cotelle the elder, doubtless a gift from Louis XIV in 1688 to thank his minister for the perfect completion of the marble Trianon de porcelaine. The large gallery, which occupies the entire right wing on the first floor, is adorned with twelve paintings by Adam Frans van der Meulen on the great battles of the reign.

Nicodemus Tessin the Younger noted the following during his visit to the castle in 1687. 
"In Meudon, I went with a Gascon gentleman (who drew all the views of ancient Egypt, named M. Le Cas) and with M. Silvestre...The most remarkable in the house was the ceiling painted in oils directly on the vault by M. de La Fosse. At the four corners of the composition, simulating stucco, two seated figures and two standing figures were painted: in the corners and between the statues, the ceiling was painted in oils directly on the vault by Charles de La Fosse. In the corners and between the statues, there was something like an oeil-de-boeuf, through which the sky could be seen. Beside the figures and to make them stand out all the better, rich rugs of different colors, and between the first and the other corner, large ovals, in the center of which was depicted Pandora. Beside them, Mercury was particularly well painted. The vault stretched over the upper cornice, and the shadow below made a very good effect. The large stucco listels all around were completely gilded. The adjoining room must also have been painted by M. de La Fosse. Above, in the oval room, the mirrors made a very good impression. They were arranged circularly and were as tall as the five windows. There was only a woodwork halfway up the wall. In each panel were placed three ice sheets, about 6 qv. High and, when you were in the center of the panel, you could see each other in the three windows at once. The gallery was nicely decorated with a number of tables of jasper, busts, etc., and all the King's actions were to be painted by Van der Meulen; Two were already completed. At one end of the gallery there was a drawing-room, in which the table and the whole panel between the two windows were lined with mirror glass, and the opening of the doors was so great that, Far, one could almost see the whole gallery. There is, moreover, a profusion of beautiful, very large mirrors. The furniture was very fine, but not of a peculiar taste. All winters are removed because of soil moisture. Beneath, in M. de Louvois's own room, there were three pipes of copper that permitted heat to pass at will. This heat came from a copper stove placed in the chimney of the neighboring room. A ventilation pipe passing under the vestibule arrived at this chimney, and then distributed the heat, when the window of this chamber was opened (like the "heat-making machine" at Versailles).

Borne to one of the sides of the stable by pillars of stones or buttresses, the house is externally in very bad condition. The site is rugged to the possible but nevertheless very pleasant. The central aisle below in the garden in front of the terraces, is covered with turf and 70 yards wide; Then, in the middle of an alley of sand of eight yards wide, are spruces and other trees; Then, on two sides, a new lawn of nine yards, and again a sandy alley with trees eight yards wide. The parterre of M. Le Nostre, in the middle, in front of the cave that I have drawn, is very nice, so the two "embroidery" in the center in front of the house, with two marble vases and marble statues around the oval basin, hand-built as tiles did not do a bad effect. I also drew the boxes of the orange trees there, taking them separately. This garden is surrounded, as well as the park, by a wall at least seven miles in circumference. At the bottom of the garden was another large pleasure-house, which M. de Louvois had bought for life for M. Honoré Courtin Courtin.

Outside, Louvois had extensive hydraulic works to power the waterways of the park, and allow the most spectacular water jets. The upper park was developed, while Le Notre worked on the gardens continually throughout the 1680s and created practically all of the lower gardens, invented new groves and parterre, including the one in front of the Grotto. Louvois also arranged a large vegetable garden along the avenue of the castle, in order to meet the needs of the castle, a vegetable garden which would later be called "the vegetable garden of the Dauphin". In short, he builds everything at Meudon that Louis XIV did in a more spectacular way still at Versailles at the same time. And he asked Israel Silvestre, drawing master of the Louis de France to engrave the entire estate, which Silvestre carried out with several very spectacular prints, among the most careful of his work.

In July 1681, the Queen of France, Maria Theresa of Spain, came to visit Meudon, where "Mr. de Louvoy had the honor of serving her" (d After the "Mercure Galant" of July 1681.) On August 17, 1684, Louvois had a great feast prepared for Meudon, in honor of Philip of Orleans (1640–1701). The King, and his wife, owners of the neighboring castle of Saint-Cloud, especially on July 2, 1685, Louis XIV, Louis de France The Dauphin, the Dauphine, Monsieur and Madame, "accompany the greater part of the Princes and Lords of the Court," come to Meudon, where Louvois treats the King and the whole Court " Of magnificence. "It was given" a magnificent collation, during which all the violins and oboes of the Opera played melodies by Jean-Baptiste Lully "(...)" But M. de Louvo He was sorry to see that he was pleased the whole time the king was with him." In 1686, a reception is still given to Meudon, in honor of the Siam ambassadors, who discovered both the gardens and the castle. Louvois was not present to receive them since he was with Maintenon and the King, to follow the work on the Eure canal. On August 25, 1689, Louvois again received Philip of Orleans (1640–1701) at dinner in Meudon. On the 29th of June, 1691, two weeks before the sudden death of Louvois, "Monseigneur went to Meudon with Madame Princesse de Conti; they made a snack at the chateau, and walked for a long time in the park and in the gardens "(Dangeau).

On July 16, 1691, Louvois died suddenly at Versailles. He had reached the point of honors, and the splendor of Meudon symbolized this power materially.

On the proposal of Louis XIV, the widow of Louvois, Anne of Souvré and his son Barbézieux agreed to exchange Meudon for the Chateau de Choisy and a balance. In the memoirs of the Marquis de Dangeau, on Wednesday, June 1, 1695: "In the morning, the king proposed to M. de Barbezieux the exchange of Choisy with Meudon; He asked her how much Madame de Louvois had taken Meudon in her share; M. de Barbezieux told him that she had taken him for a unit of 500,000 francs; The King told him that he would give him 400,000 of his return, and Choisy, whom he counted for 100,000 francs, if that were agreeable to Madame de Louvois; That he charged him to go and learn of her, but that he did not ask her for any complacency; That he wished that she should treat with him as with a private person, and should think only of his interests. M. de Barbezieux went to Paris to find his mother, who is pleased with the king's offer, and to whom the exchange is well suited. The contract will be signed on the first day; We started talking about business only in the morning, and it was finished in the evening."  The castle, valued at 500,000 livres, and already considerably embellished by succeeding owners, knew its most brilliant period.

The apogee: Louis XIV and Monseigneur (1695–1711)

Works of the prince 

The Grand Dauphin did extensive work at Meudon and turned it into his special showplace, spending a sum of one million one hundred forty thousand French livres, although the king his father had put it among the royal residences and in the charge of the Bâtiments du Roi. Over sixteen years, at least three million livres were spent embellishing and maintaining the estate, a colossal sum. The prince redecorated the apartments to his liking. The Dauphin allowed Meudon to express his own artistic conceptions, breaking with the sometimes compassed aspect of the Louis XIV style. Although not for the first time, Meudon systematically used "Capucine" woodwork, carved and varnished strips of wood with gilt accents. Regency style partially manifested at Meudon. The Dauphin gathered there his rich collections, which attempted to compete with those of the king: agate vases, Indian fabrics, Gobelin tapestries, Chinese porcelain, paintings by great masters and especially his collection of gems. He did not hesitate to redecorate some rooms several times, removing for example the ceiling painted by Charles de La Fosse to give expression to the light style of Claude Audran. His main apartment was located the length of the ground floor in the east wing of the Château-Vieux. He also had the parade apartment in the Château-Neuf, as well as a "small fresh apartment" in the chestnut tree wing.

The Dauphin liked to surround himself at Meudon with his family, his friends and courtisans, in particular Marie-Adelaide of Savoy the Duchess of Burgundy, Marie-Anne of Bourbon (1666- 1739), his daughter-in-law, the Princess of Conti, and Louise Francoise de Bourbon, Duchess of Bourbon, (1673–1743), her two half-sisters, Louis-Antoine de Pardaillan de Gondrin D'Antin son of Madame de Montespan. He also lodged his mistress, Marie-Émilie de Joly de Choin. Like his father at the Castle of Marly, the Dauphin liked to find a relaxed and warm atmosphere in Meudon with chosen companions. To accommodate this numerous entourage, the Dauphin undertook extensive additions. In 1702, space at the Château-Vieux soon proved inadequate. He had the chestnut tree wing, the former courtyard of the offices, rearranged so as to connect it to the chateau by a hanging gallery. He arranged a large reception hall on the ground floor. He also built a new commons, which are still visible. He entrusted to Jules Hardouin-Mansart, the architect of all these works, the construction of a chapel. Antoine Coypel, one of the favorite painters of the Dauphin, painted the altar paintings, the "Resurrection", a monumental painting, and the "Annunciation", much smaller in size. The sculptures are realized by Noël Jouvenet, François Lespingola and Jean Hardy.

In 1705, space was still lacking to accommodate the courtiers, more and more numerous. At any moment, Monseigneur might become the next king of France, through the death of the aging Louis XIV. The Dauphin then decided to demolish the grotto, which was out of fashion, and to build a new castle, the Château-Neuf . Jules Hardouin-Mansart and Louis XIV collaborated on the project, which was entrusted to the contractors of the chapel and the Palais de Versailles. All the work at Meudon was indeed done by the same artists employed by the king, who worked for the institution of the King's Buildings.

The Château-Neuf had five levels, but due to the steep slope, did not have the same appearance on the side of the parterre as on the side of the forest. It was composed of three pavilions crowned with roofs with ridge terrace, connected by building wings. This sober architecture, which was not to overshadow the architectural character of the neighboring Château-Vieux, was nevertheless enriched by fine sculptures on the side pavilions, and the central pediments, where angels holding the coat of arms of the Dauphin. Inside, a succession of apartments opened onto a large central corridor. The interior decoration, which highlighted the collections of the Dauphin, was composed of woodwork panels varnished or painted in pastel colors, enhanced by gilding. A ceremonial apartment was planned for Monseigneur, since Louis XIV retained his usual accommodation in the Château-Vieux, despite the new construction. The Château-Neuf was the admiration of all Europe. It was imitated some ten years later by the Duke of Antin at the Petit-Bourg castle in Evry.

The richness of the hanging gardens 

The gardens were not to be outdone. The poem titled Maison royale de Meudon (Royal House of Meudon), dated 1703, even compared them to the Hanging Gardens of Babylon of Semiramis. To expand Meudon, the Dauphin in 1696 acquired the neighboring estate of Chaville. He thus formed a vast hunting preserve where he and his father, who also liked Meudon, practiced venery. The park of Meudon was thus linked to that of Versailles, and together they made up the Grand Parc de Versailles, extending from Meudon to Saint-Germain-en-Laye. Many embellishments are carried out in the gardens. Louis XIV took pleasure in advising his son on them. The King - or his son - even drew up a "" a guide in the style of the texts written for Versailles.

18th century 

At the death of the Dauphin in 1711, the castle was still perfectly maintained, since the Bâtiments du Roi (King's Buildings) administered it. Nevertheless, until the death of Louis XIV, no member of the royal family returned to Meudon, as a result of the remarks made by Louis XIV the day after the death of Monseigneur his son, wishing that the new Dauphin, the Duke of Burgundy, make no more trips to Meudon. The Marquis de Sourches, on the 17th of April, 1711, notes that "Meudon was completely emptied and that all the furnishings were taken to the King's furniture storehouse."

On 17 May 1717, the Tsar Peter the Great, accompanied by Prince Rakoczy and the Marshal de Tessé visited Meudon and rode horseback in the gardens.

On May 16, 1718, Madame de Ventadour organized a fireworks show for Louis XV, who visited Meudon two or three times a week all that summer. On the following June 6, a new fireworks display was mounted in honor of the king.

Duchess of Berry, daughter of the Regent (1718–1719) 

Marie Louise Élisabeth d'Orléans, Duchess of Berry, eldest daughter of the Regent, owned the Château d'Amboise and wanted to swap it for Meudon. She was then the first lady of the court of France, and both cousin and aunt to the young unmarried king. The Regent eventually agreed to the exchange effective 30 October 1718. The Duchess of Berry, who was then pregnant, gave the management of this new residence to her paramour, the Count of Riom, lieutenant of her guards. Riom took possession of the castle the next day, 31 October. But the governor in office, Hyacinthe de Gauréault Dumont nevertheless retained his salary. On 2 November 1718, the Duchess went to Meudon to choose her apartments. On 8 February and 24 March 1719, the Regent came to Meudon to have supper with his beloved daughter, by then just about to give birth.

From April 12 to May 14, 1719, the duchess was convalescing at Meudon, hoping to recover from her harrowing delivery. She died on July 21, 1719, at her Château de la Muette in Paris, to she had travelled from Meudon. On 22 July 1719, a few hours after her death, seals were affixed to her properties: the Luxembourg palace and her castles of La Muette and Meudon.

Saint-Simon (1719–1722) 

After the death of his daughter, Regent made Meudon available in favor of Saint-Simon one of his principal advisers, a considerable honor. Thus, the famous memorialist could stay close to Saint-Cloud, where the Regent owned his family castle. On the night of June 15–16, 1722, the marriage of the daughter of Saint-Simon, Charlotte of Saint-Simon, with the Prince de Chimay was celebrated at the chateau. The blessing was given by the Abbé Languet de Gercy, parish priest of Saint-Sulpice.

Louis XV and his children 

Le 27 septembre 1722, à la demande du jeune roi, le Maréchal de Villars vient à Meudon voir le fortin construit pour Louis XV, qui « lui parla souvent de son fort et le mena à toutes les attaques ». Rappelons que Louis XV était petit-fils de Monseigneur.

On the 17 April 1723, the King went to Meudon, went through the apartments of the Chateau, and gave some orders for the stay which his Majesty was to go there to do. Indeed, from 4 June to 13 August 1723, Louis XV, the "Infante Reine", the Regent and the Court settled in Meudon for a month, time enough to restore Versailles to house the young sovereigns. On August 10, Cardinal William Dubois died at Versailles. "As soon as he was dead, the Duke of Orleans returned to Meudon to inform the King of this news, who begged him to take charge of all the conduct of affairs, declared him Prime Minister, and was sworn in on the following day" . Pierre-Denis Martin (1663–1742) painted for the king "A vision of Meudon in perspective that includes all the park and the castle, Monseigneur entering there."

On December 14, 1725, the new queen Marie Leszczynska, who married Louis XV on September 4, came to visit Meudon for the first time.

Finally, in September 1726, a royal edict brought together Meudon at the Crown Estate with the land that depended on it, with the exception of Chaville Castle and Park, and Castle and farm of Villacoublay. On this occasion, the arms of Le Tellier - azure, with three lizards of silver laid in pal, to the chief sewn Gules charged with three gold stars - which were still in place within the central pediment, are erased.

In May 1733, at Versailles, a scene was set up between Louis XV and the governor of the castle of Meudon: Marquis de Pellevé,

"Stay of the Children of France in Meudon in 1733.

The sojourn of the children of France at Meudon was decided at the beginning of May, 1733, in an assembly of doctors held in Versailles, with regard to their health, the death of Madame The Duke of Anjou having frightened the others.

Their journey was subsequently scheduled for the 21st of the same month and a few days before De Pellevé, Governor of this castle, speaking of their stay with M. le Cardinal de Fleury, told him that it would cause him some expense, and that he was persuaded that his Eminence wished And to treat him like his predecessor M. Hyacinthe de Gauréault Dumont had been there while the feu Roy remained there, and to grant him the same gratification.

The cardinal replied that the king's affairs were not in a position to make such graces, which did not prevent him from taking the time that the cardinal was with the king to speak to him in the presence of His Majesty and His Eminence told him the same thing.

He did not confine himself to these two rejections, he made the same request on the 21st, at the time when his Majesty was speaking to the duke Of Charot. The King replied that the matter was decided, which obliged him to cease. Only for a few moments: for he has again returned to the charge, and has represented to the King that he has interrupted a second time, the expense which he would be obliged to make, and the injustice which was done to him, His Majesty to tell the captain of his guards to take him out of his room. It was ordered to the officer of the guards who commanded Meudon not to let him enter the chamber of the Louis de France (1729–1765) or the ladies".

Queen's parents: the visit of Stanislas Leszczyński (1736–1737) 

On 4 June 1736, Stanislas Leszczyński, after abdicating in April, temporarily settled in Meudon. According to the Duke of Luynes, "S. M. [Sa Majesté Louis XV] goes there at least once a week since the king and queen of Poland live there."

On 30 September 1736, King Stanislas secretly signed the Declaration of Meudon under pressure from Louis XV and the Cardinal Fleury. According to the terms of the agreement, possession of the Duchy of Bar would be "current" for the former Polish king and "possible" for Louis XV.

On 18 January 1737, Leszczyński handed the seals to the new Chancellor, who swore an oath to the King of Poland. The ceremony took place in the large vestibule of the Château Vieux, on the ground floor of the central pavilion. The painting by François-André Vincent of this ceremony, is from much later, since it dates only from 1778.

On 31 March 1737, "the king went today to Meudon bid farewell to the king and queen of Poland" (Duke of Luynes). They left Meudon the next day, 1 April. The two castles were then stripped of their furnishings.

In the summer of 1743, facing the threat of Charles Alexander, Queen Catherine  of Poland, wife of Stanislas and mother of the French queen, took refuge in Meudon. Stanislas took refuge in Metz.

The Knight of Fréjus visited Meudon on 5 May 1748. He left the following description:
On the 5th of May 1748, the first Sunday of the month, I went to Meudon by galiot. We went up to Sèvres and from Sèvres we went upriver to the Capuchin monastery at Meudon, where we heard mass. The church there is not unusual, but their garden is very beautiful. From there we ascended the terrace of Meudon to the château, which is situated on a mountain from which all of Paris and the surrounding villages can be viewed. All the hills around Meudon are planted in vineyards and well maintained. The castle is superb. I noticed on the main entrance the arms of Louvois, and below the image of Louis XIV in metal. A gallery reigns in beauty outside the windows of this castle, as well as a facade on the side of the garden, charming. The Swiss then took me to the apartments, which are very beautiful, though less extensive than those of the Palace of Versailles. I saw two chambers lined in Gobelins tapestry of admirable beauty.

Most rooms are covered in mirrors. The gallery leading to the chapel is superb. I saw there a very fine picture of the siege of Mannheim under Louis XIV, and a bust of Alexander of porphyry which is inestimable. Another, of Aristotle in Egyptian marble, is seen as a masterpiece. The chapel of the castle is very agreeable, with a single nave. There is only one altar, whose painting represents the resurrection of our Lord Jesus Christ, but it is one of the most beautiful pictures that can be seen, and is said to be of Raphael by Antoine Coypel.  From the castle we were led to see the new apartment [the Château-Neuf]  It is very lovely and very agreeable, but less handsome than the first. From the castles to the village which is at the foot of the mountain, one sees only parterres and gardens of a charming cleanliness and arrangement. We saw the orangeries, the greenhouses. They are far from being as beautiful as those of Versailles. From there we ascended by a superb staircase to the top of the mountain, where you find the most beautiful alleys of trees, with beautiful pools of water. Going through the woods on the side of Sèvres, you find a basin of prodigious expanse, at the top of the mountain, beside a green meadow with a very gracious view. The alleys and gardens of Meudon have no beautiful statues as at the park at Versailles. The castles themselves do not approach the richness of that of Versailles but the location of Meudon...provides a beautiful view...The stables there are not beautiful. After seeing all that there was to see, we were dined at Meudon in the village... For dinner for three, including me, I paid three livres... [I] have not eaten elsewhere pigeons so fat (...)

Château de Bellevue preferred after 1750 

As an adult, Louis XV preferred the Château de Bellevueâ that he had built for Madame de Pompadour. The castle was used to accommodate courtiers, and the castle stables are used to serve Bellevue, whose stables were very small.

Louis XVI and Marie-Antoinette in Meudon 

The new young king often liked to come and hunt in Meudon. One year after his accession, the architect  drew up an inventory dated October 10, 1775, which enumerates the "mirrors, marbles, paintings and other effects belonging to the King" in the castle. In the margin are drawn overall diagrams of all the mirrors.

An edict of the king, in May 1778, united the domain of Meudon to that of Versailles, "to be governed and administered in the future in the same manner."

Louis XVI himself designed a pavilion called the "Trivaux Pavilion" in 1783, in an Anglo-Chinese style, which was finally corrected in a more French style by the architect Jean-François Heurtier. This pavilion was situated at the very top of the green carpet of Meudon, towards Meudon-la-Forêt. At Meudon Louis XVI and his wife Marie-Antoinette lost little Louis-Joseph de France, who died on June 4, 1789, a month before the capture of the Bastille.

In 1791, the castle still served as a holiday home for the new Dauphin, as represented by a watercolor by Jean-Baptiste Isabey.

In his "Journal," on June 8, 1788, Marquis de Bombelles described Meudon:

"I accompanied the ladies to the ambassadors at the chateau de Meudon. The new castle, where we dined at the house of the Duke of Harcourt, was built by Monseigneur for Marie Émilie de Joly de Choin, his mistress. This castle is in a proportion which would render it suitable to every nobleman in a position to spend from 2 to 300,000 livres a year. It is not the same with the old castle. This palace, which M. de Louvois had enlarged, embellished with a magnificence as indecent as it is incredible, would still very easily be a truly royal residence. All the ceilings are painted in arabesque, as if the reigning taste had presided over their order. The cornices, the chimneys, the parquets of superb woodwork, nothing would need to be modernized. There is, in a turret, a cabinet painted also in arabesque on a background of gold, which is as fresh of paint as if it came from the hands of one of our best artists. It is a question of making this beautiful castle the home of all the summers, if we do not feel the sorrow of losing this prince."

19th century: between pomp and decline 

After 10 August 1792, the fate of the castle became uncertain. The National Convention quickly took care to remove most of the over-the-door paintings, carefully disassembled and transferred to provincial museums, which saved them from destruction.

"Castle of the Republic" (1793–1795) 

On November 4, 1793, Pierre Choderlos de Laclos, appointed chief commissioner of experiments at Meudon, took possession on behalf of the Minister of Marine of this place, where he had suggested setting up an artillery and ammunition tests

But Choderlos de Laclos stayed only one day in Meudon, since he was arrested the next day. The site was transformed by the Convention into a national facility for various tests. It would serve as a factory for aerostats and became the "castle of the Republic", which serves as a place of experimentation to arm the new regime. As such, the castle will be the object of an illumination paid by the public funds.

Nicolas-Jacques Conté was, together with several other scientists, in charge of these military and scientific experiments at Meudon, where he was given direction of the aerostation school established there. Conté had under his orders a confused gathering of young men in all professions, without any dye of chemistry, drawing, or mathematics, who were called upon to create an entirely new technique. Conté had to approach the elements of the different sciences, for this new teaching had to embrace everything: chemistry, physics, mechanics. Conté, by giving both theoretical and practical lessons, Conté had the models he gave, the instruments he imagined, executed by the hands of his pupils, spending his nights preparing drawings for his lessons, Experiences, sometimes dangerous.

Château-Vieux fire and demolition 

In 1795, a fire, linked to the technical research of the occupants, ravaged the chestnut tree wing and damaged the west wing of the Castle-Vieux. The castle remained in this condition for nearly a decade. Many English visitors came to Meudon from 1802, and left several descriptions or drawings (for example the drawing of James Forbes). English colonel Henry Thornton Thornton, of Thornville-Royal, Yorkshire, describes the site in a letter written in English, dated August 31, 1802:
The day before, M. Belanger had proposed to us an excursion to Meudon, a pretty park whose interior covered the walls of twenty miles, and which had been Designated as a more than desirable potential investment. A chair had been fixed on a most comfortable carriage, in view of this expedition. The castle of Meudon, originally residence of Madame de Pompadour [sic], consists of an immense block, unfortunately, dilapidated. It nevertheless retains some traces of its past splendor. We were politely received by the concierge (or maybe he was the caretaker), whose manor was always likely to be converted into a pleasant one, in a beautiful park with a forest landscape covered with water jets and ponds. residence. This person led us to the castle, drawing our attention especially to the apartments of which the last occupant was none other than the unfortunate dauphin. I did not have time for further exploration of the park, but my guide informed me that it included farms, plains, etc., all within 500 acres, to which 10,000 acres of forest. He also told us that the walls were once partly collapsed, on the orders of the late king, in order to give the game the possibility of escape, but that these had since been repaired. He also pointed out that the estate comprised 29 water bodies of various sizes, leading me immediately to one of them, with a capacity of about 9 acres. The latter was walled and partly surrounded by a wooded landscape, but its shape offered, from a distance, a pleasant rendering. It was also necessary to take into account the presence of some fish, hares and rabbits, as well as a reasonable number of partridges on the estate. On the other hand, all the pheasants had been slaughtered. The whole of the castle, as I said before, is now in ruins, and to entirely shave it would entail considerable expense, the cement of these old buildings being particularly solid. But from the point of view of its extent and its proximity to the capital, Meudon would undoubtedly constitute a precious acquisition (...)

The painter Hubert Robert, who was in charge of the landscaping of the gardens of Meudon under Louis XVI, comes to draw the demolition site in 1804. The Château-Vieux is destroyed from [1803]. In 1805, there is still a small part of the Château-Vieux (southwestern pavilion) as well as the chapel, as indicated by François Collet Duclos in his report of 3 Ventose 13 (February 22, 1805). The whole was the subject of excavation works until about 1808, after recovering some ornaments, including the stone columns nowadays located in the small rotunda of the Palais du Luxembourg (Senate), that the architect Jean Chalgrin was able to reuse.

Napoleon : Meudon, Imperial Palace of the King of Rome (1807–1815) 

After deciding in 1803 to demolish the Château-Vieux, which had been burnt down in 1795, and when he was only Bonaparte, Emperor Napoleon decided in 1807 to make the Château-Neuf an imperial palace. He restored the gardens and refurbished the Château-Neuf, notably by the architect Jean-Baptiste Lepère. A wing called the "Economat" was erected on the site of a part of the ruins of the chestnut wing. The Emperor, who wanted to make Meudon a "school of kings" in Europe, installed the King of Rome in 1811, under the responsibility of his governess, Louise Charlotte Françoise de Montesquiou. To this end, numerous orders were made to furnish the palace of the Empire's heir (new Empire style decoration), furnishings, silks, etc.).

On April 22, 1811, Napoleon I visited Meudon. On June 30, 1811, Meudon was placed at the disposal of Letizia Bonaparte. In April 1812, the King of Rome came to stay at Meudon.
During the summer, Queen of Westphalia, wife of Jerome Bonaparte, also stayed at Meudon, with Madame Mother. The Empress was said to have resided at the palace during the Russian campaign, although she was staying at Saint-Cloud. From March 24 to November 14, 1813, the Queen of Westphalia made another visit to Meudon.

But, at the fall of the First Empire, the castle lost its status of Imperial Palace.

Meudon under the Restoration and the Orleans 

Louis XVIII, Charles X and Louis-Philippe used Meudon as a hunting ground near Versailles.

Charles Ferdinand, son of Charles X, went to Meudon to hunt between 1815 and 1820.

After his abdication of the Imperial throne of Brazil on April 7, 1831, Pedro I of Brazil returned to Europe and settled in France with the title of Duke of Braganza. In the autumn of 1831 he spent some time at the Château-Neuf, an estate the king Louis-Philippe freely put at his disposal. During his stay in France, he became a friend of the famous General La Fayette.

A studio was then installed below the old gardens at the bottom of Meudon. The Prince of Orleans, under the July Monarchy stayed there in 1834 and wrote his memoirs there. But in 1842 he died accidentally in Neuilly-sur-Seine.

Louis-Philippe also made available the castle of Meudon to Marshal Jean-de-Dieu Soult, who stayed there several times in the summer.

On May 8, 1842, a railway catastrophe took place in Meudon, in which Jules Dumont d'Urville perished. It was the first in France and one of the first in the world. Louis-Philippe I offered the Château-Neuf to treat survivors.

After the revolution of 1848, plans were made to make Meudon the new headquarters of the Ecole Polytechnique. But these grandiose projects, one of which was established by the architect Hector-Martin Lefuel, did not in the end see the light of day.

Second Empire: hideout of Prince Napoleon 

Although Meudon was assigned to Prince Jerome's uncle Napoleon III, he did not visit the property. On the contrary, from 1860 to 1870, his son, Napoleon Bonaparte, cousin of the Emperor Napoleon III, often occupied Meudon. In Paris, he owned the famous Pompeian house sheltering his connection with the actress Rachel Felix, but it was to Meudon that he came to "sulk" over the protocol at the imperial court, of which he was not fond. He brought his wife Marie-Clotilde of Savoy and her three children, Louis Bonaparte (1864–1932), Louis Victor and Marie Laetitia. He collected many species of plants and exotic animals, brought back from his travels abroad. Several large receptions were organized at the castle, such as the one in honor of Louis I, king of Portugal, in 1867.

1871 Château-Neuf fire and takeover by the Observatoire de Paris 

Because the site is strategic, dominating Paris, a battery of Prussian artillery was installed there in 1870. The new castle caught fire on 31 January 1871 and burned for almost three days. Hypotheses on the cause included either a deliberate fire set by the Prussians as they left, or a bombardment by  La Douai , a naval cannon, placed in bastion 74 of the Thiers precinct. The ruins were preserved for several years, until the site was entrusted to astronomer Jules Janssen in 1875. Janssen did not hesitate to raze nearly half the Château-Neuf, and together with architect Constant Moyaux, between 1880 and 1885 built there an astronomical observatory, later attached to the Paris Observatory in 1927.

Since then most of the estate (high preserved gardens) has been closed to the general public, and remains so to this day.

The 20th century: a gradual renovation 

Over the years, vegetation has encircled the Orangery, making it inaccessible. The destruction of the old village of Meudon after the war, and the reconstruction of the city center, has removed the once picturesque setting of multiple roofs at the foot of the old castle. The notion of heritage did not gain traction in French society until the 1970s and 1980. The entire estate is now registered as a historic monument, though this was done very late for such a historic site, while similar large estates in Ile-de-France had been declared historic well before.

The domain today 

Although the Château-Vieux was destroyed, it still retains much of the splendor of the domain. In fact, 40% of the surface area of the original buildings, (the remains of the Château-Neuf, orangerie, communes, etc), still exists. One can still admire the avenue of the castle traced by Louvois, the guardhouses and common of the Grand Dauphin, the kennel of Louvois, the great prospect of Servien, the nymph and the orangery of Louis Le Vau, and one can imagine the terraced gardens below the observatory, as well as the pond of Chalais and the green carpet. And above all, the large terrace, the most impressive achievement, is perfectly preserved. The orangery of Meudon was completely restored in 2012.

Thanks to its exceptional location (Paris-Versailles, the most touristic area in France) and its panoramic view of Paris (one of the most spectacular in Ile-de-France), the site is a tourist and economic hub.

The domain today

Legal status: a split and partly inaccessible space 

Today, the domain of Meudon is divided in two parts.

The lower part: The large terrace and the orangery are managed by the city and are freely accessible to the public.

The upper part: The Observatory (Chateau-Neuf), the high gardens, as well as the communes situated at the entrance, come under the Ministry of National Education and are assigned to the Observatory of Paris. They are closed to the public.

The State still owns the entire estate, both the part assigned to the Observatory and that which is managed by the city government.

However, as regards the part of the domain accessible to the public, the State has signed a management agreement for the national domain of Meudon with the town of Meudon, which now manages it. Financially, the State still plays its role as owner and manages the pruning and maintenance work. It leaves it to the City to manage the site located within its territory.

The rehabilitation project of the Great Perspective 

The project to reconstitute the Great Perspective of Meudon was launched as early as the 1980s, but has made little progress to date. Nevertheless, it continues, in consultation with the parties concerned. Indeed, three quarters of this major landscape axis of Ile-de-France, by André Le Nôtre, are preserved. Only the part between the orangery gardens and the Chalais Pond remains blocked.

Archaeological potential 

No excavation has ever been undertaken on the site of the Chateau-Vieux. However, the demolition records are formal: all the cellars and ditches remain under the current lawn. An archaeological campaign could make it possible to highlight this hidden heritage.

The only unknown parameter is the exact nature of the impact on the subsoil at the Château-Vieux right-of-way during the Prussian occupation in the Franco-Prussian War of 1870. Indeed, The Prussians occupied the whole terrace of Meudon, to bombard the capital and monitor operations.

Detail of the domain

Vieux-Château 

The Château-Vieux was the central building of the estate, and the first historical castle at Meudon. It aligned with the Great Perspective.

Ground floor

Grand Vestibule and Great Staircase 
These rooms were created when Louis Le Vau rebuilt the central pavilion of the castle for Abel Servien between 1655 and 1658.

"Grand Apartment" of Monseigneur 

This was the principal dwelling in Meudon of Louis, Grand Dauphin (1661–1711), son of Louis XIV, on the ground floor of the east wing of the Château-Vieux. It was preserved intact throughout the 18th century.

In its final configuration, beginning in 1701, it was composed successively of:
 Guard room;
 Dining room enlivened by four canvases of Bacchus;
 Billiard room, adorned with four oval canvases of mythological subjects;
 Antechamber;
 Bedroom of the Dauphin, where he died of smallpox on April 14, 1711;
 Corner cabinet;
 Small wooden wardrobe in the Capucine style;
 A small Capucine mezzanine, wooded

Guardroom 

Blondel specifies in his  Françoise Architecture : "In the House of Guards, in a Royal House, is called a large room where the Guards of the Prince are held, and against the panels of which are attached carabiners, To lay down their arms; They also place in these sorts of places taborets, which are the kinds of tables on which are made the counts, and of which the bottom receives during the day the beds in which the guards rest during the night. These rooms must be spacious, very high, have large chimneys, and be decorated with simplicity. See those of Versailles, of Meudon, of the Chateau des Thuileries ...".

Dining room of the Dauphin (from 1700) 

The 1775 inventory indicates that after the additions and other work of 1700, the room was "wooded height of gilded frames, cornice of the same, chimney of Campan green marble ...". In 1700, Monseigneur commissioned four different painters to paint "bacchic" subjects. The same artists then adorned the grand salon of the Chateau de Marly.
 By Charles de La Fosse (1636–1716): 
The triumph of Bacchus, who is carried on an elephant, with his tyrsus in his right hand, several Baccantes around him carrying instruments. In the foreground are two children, one mounted on a tiger, on the left one sees Silenus on the reverse.
 By Jean Jouvenet (1644–1717):  Mercury who takes flight after having put Bacchus in the hands of the Nymphs. This relates to the legend of his mother Semele, who was beloved by Jupiter, and whose downfall by lightning was engineered by Jupiter’s jealous wife Juno.
 By Bon Boullogne (1649–1717):  Venus, Bacchus and Ceres, namely "A passage from Horace which says that without the good dear Venus cools; On the left of the picture is Baccus, who presses a grape of grapes into a cup held by a Flora; Beside her, a Ceres who looks at her; In the bottom, under a trellis, there is a dressed buffet; In the of the picture, below, there are two little children who seem to ask to drink, are lying on a tiger." This painting is preserved in the Louvre Museum where it is called "Bacchus and Ariane". It is also named in the ancient inventories ‘’Bacchus and Ariane’’, ‘’Bacchus and Erigone’’ or ‘’Bacchus, Flora and Ceres’’. Sent to the Central Museum at the end of the year II, it lost its attribution but remained at the Louvre, where it was found among the anonymous members of the French school. It is to be restored. 
 By Antoine Coypel (1661–1722):  The theme comes from episode number six of Virgil's ‘’Eclogues’’, entitled "Silenus," in which Virgil writes: "And as the old man opens his eyes, he blushes his forehead and the temples of the juice Bloody of the blackberry." Silenus, asleep in a cave after his usual drinking, is surprised by two satyrs and the nymph Egle, for whom he promised to sing. The two satyrs seized Silenus, whom they bound with ivy, while the beautiful Egle blushed her face with blackberries, which she crushed in order to snatch from her threat the fulfillment of her promise. Measurements: 4 feet 9 inches by 4 feet 1 inches. The picture was substantially cut in the nineteenth century. It is preserved in the Museum of Fine Arts of Reims

Billiard room 
Beginning in 1700, the old staircase by Louvois and Jules Hardouin Mansart was demolished  to create a series of rooms, including the "Salon du Billard". The 1775 inventory says that the room is "wooded of height, with gilded frames, gilded cornices, chimney of gryot marble".

Monseigneur ordered for this room a series of paintings above the doors, of the same size and all of oval form:

 By Charles de La Fosse: Hercules between Vice and Virtue: "At the top of the picture Wisdom, represented by Minerva, whose child is wearing a shield, points out to Hercules the temple of Memory on the left. Height 4ft 10in; L. 3ft 5 in; oval.

For this work Charles de La Fosse was paid twice, 600 livres in 1700, and 200 livres more in 1701, "for the perfect payment of 800 livres for the picture he made at Meudon, representing Hercules".

. The painting, painted in 1700, had a format of 3 feet 10 inches by 3 feet 5 inches. Frédéric Villot correctly identified the painting at Meudon with a canvas, now rectangular, in the museum of Nevers in 1872

By Jean Jouvenet: Latone and the peasants of Lycia, where one discovers "Latone with his two sons asking for water from the peasants of Lycia who refused to appear in an attitude of supplication, raising his arms upwards, invoking Jupiter who transforms them into frogs; At the bottom of the landscape there appears a flock of cows passing over the edge of the marsh. " A copy of this work is preserved in the Museum of Art and History of Meudon, another, undoubtedly the original, in the Palace of Fontainebleau It is inspired directly by the central white marble sculpture of the Latone fountain in the gardens of the Palace of Versailles.

 Latone et les paysans lyciens: By Louis de Boullogne the Younger. Cephale and Procris (Cephalus of Phocis and his wife) who gives a dart to his husband; She has her left arm extended and her hand resting on a dog she seems to caress; At the top of the picture there appears a cupid which carries the torch of the hymen." After being deposited at Compiègne, the painting was sent in 1962 to the Musée de Saint-Etienne under the title:  Venus and Adonis , and attributed in error to Bon Boullogne. Its ancient oval shape is clearly visible. The painting was made and posed in 1700, as David and Abigail commissioned by the same painter. A preparatory drawing is held at the Cabinet des Arts Graphiques in the Louvre.
 Antoine Coypel], then the youngest painter of the four:  'Hercules bringing back Alceste from the underworld; Height 3 feet 10 inches; Width 3 feet. It is a question of "Hercules returning to Admetus his wife Alceste that he brings back from the Underworld", a picture brought to Meudon by Antoine Coypel himself. The painting was placed before May 1700, according to a memoir cited by F. Engerand  Charles-Antoine Coypel, the painter's son, showed the novelty of these literary subjects. To execute the painting of Meudon, Antoine Coypel was translated by Mme Dacier the fifth act of the tragedy of Euripides. The painting is preserved in the Cholet Museum of Art and History, Cholet Museum of Art and History. The work was formerly titled "Hercules Delivering Theseus"! In May 1700, Antoine Coypel came to Meudon himself to install his barely completed work.

Antechamber (former dining room of the Dauphin from 1695 to 1699) 

The former "dining room of Monseigneur", which had this function in 1695, became a real antechamber with the enlargement of the apartment. The inventory of 1775 indicates: "Room lighted by two windows, paneling with gold frames, gilded cornice, ceiling in gilt arabesque and painted by Audran. Jacques-François Blondel recalls his admiration for these ceilings of arabesques at Meudon, although he condemns the style of the ceiling to decorate the dwelling of a prince:
« D'ailleurs l'on peut réduire ces ouvrages à des nuages avec des Génies, & à quelques belle grisaille qui en forme les extrémités; décoration préférable à ces riches, mais peu vraisemblables peintures grotesques, dont on voit d'ingénieux desseins d'Audran, & qui sont exécutées avec un succès étonnant dans quelques appartements de Meudon, aussi bien que dans les plafonds & sur les lambris du Château de la Ménagerie: seul bâtiment où ce genre de peinture soit convenable ».

The inventory of 1775 adds that there is also a "green Campan marble chimney, the top of the mantelpiece decorated with marble of any height with gold-bronze ornamentation of ground gold, the mirror in two parts, the first 52 inches wide by 96 inches high, the second 52 inches by 26 inches high. Two paintings above the doors of each 3 feet 6 inches wide by 2 feet 9 inches high, representing fruit and flowers, painted by Batiste Fontenay".

In this antechamber, the dauphin placed the collection of paintings offered to Louis XIV in 1693 by André Le Nôtre and which the king put at the disposal of his son. These works are now preserved in the Louvre Museum.

Bedchamber of the Grand Dauphin 

The inventory of 1775 indicates that the chamber of the Dauphin possessed: "Wall panels of gilded frames, gilded cornice, gilded ceiling and painted in arabesques by Claude Audran III, marble serancolin fireplace, the top in violet brown marble, the whole very ornamented with bronze gilded of ground gold. (...) Two paintings above doors of 3 feet 5 inches by 4 feet 1 inch of width representing fruits painted by Batiste ". It is in this room that Monseigneur died on April 14, 1711. This chimney excited the curiosity of the researchers: the famous little painting preserved at Versailles, representing "the Regent in his Cabinet of work with the Duke of Chartres" by Fiske Kimball as representing the Dauphin at Meudon. Of course, one finds there the type of furniture and decorations that could decorate the castle. But Jerome de La Gorce asks the right question: 
"Has this interior really existed? Is it not surprising that the chimney, the paneling to the left of the door and the desk, that is to say, most of the elements of the decoration, are identical in the engraved work of Berain? Does not the painter, whose career is still obscure, have had recourse to the plates published by the draftsman to reconstruct a framework worthy of the personages whom he represented? The inventory of the furnishings of the crown mentions in the year 1695: "[n °] 1615 - An upholstery [sic] of red and yellow satin velvet, embroidered and silver lined, listed before No. 783, Which has been upgraded and furnished to serve Monseigneur le Dauphin at Meudon, now consisting of a full bed, four armchairs, eight folding seats, two panes, two doors, six sheets of screens, a business chair and two tapestries".

In addition, Monseigneur retrieved for his room the small ebony desk encrusted with copper and tortoiseshell which he had bought at Godron, which had a plateau supported by eight bronze caryatids, with, in the middle of the marquetry, one cupid on an escarpolette. In addition to this desk, the room included a table and two pedestals, the tablets of which were decorated with Chinese grotesques with figures and birds.

Corner Cabinet 

The inventory of 1775 indicates that the room is adorned with "Wall panels with large gold frames, golden cornice, gilded ceiling with arabesques painted by Audran. Chimney of violet breccia marble, the top decorated in marble of all the height with bronzes very rich in children and ornaments gilded of ground gold (...). As with the two previous rooms, Audran decorated with arabesques the ceiling: "Having come to Meudon on April 22, 1699, the king left on the 24th; Two days later, on the 25th of April, Mansart received orders from Monsignor to have the paintings of the ceiling of his corner cabinet erased, to print it with three layers of white, and to paint a base Grotesque like that in the room of the Dauphin. " The ceiling which was then erased can only be that realized by Charles de La Fosse for Louvois, whose subject is Pandore, and whose modello has been identified by Clémentine Gustin-Gomez. In 1702 there was found: "In the Grand Cabinet of Monseigneur: Five Porcelains, 630 Louis; Two Bronzes 180 Louis. Stéphane Castelluccio identified these two bronzes as the Laocoon and Lutteurs, for which Monseigneur certainly commanded their rich 'feet of marquetry'. Finally, the inventory of the royal furniture (Tome II, pp. 434, 1697) indicates under the number: "1768 - Four couty mats striped with two strands of wool, with their threads of several colors, for the windows of the cabinet of Monseigneur at Meudon. "

Saint-Simon, describing the death of the Grand Dauphin, tells us that it is in this room, on the evening of April 14, 1711, that the famous scene of the comings and goings takes place between the corner "Cabinet" The King, and the adjoining room where Monseigneur is dying:

"As he was about to enter the room, the Princess of Conti, who had had time to run to Monseigneur's in that short interval of the table-out, presented herself to prevent him from entering the room. She even pushed him away, and told him that he must no longer think of anything but himself. Then the king, almost in weakness of so sudden and complete a reversal, let himself go on a couch which was at the entrance of the door of the closet by which he had entered, which gave into the room. He asked all that came out of it for news, and hardly anyone dared to reply. Madame de Maintenon, hastening to the king, sat on the same sofa and tried to weep. She was trying to take the king, whose carriages were already ready in the courtyard, but there was no way of making him realize that the Monseigneur had expired. This unconscious agony lasted nearly an hour after the king was in the closet. The Duchess and the Princess de Conti divided themselves between the care of the dying man and of the king, to whom they frequently returned, while the confused Faculty, the distraught valets, the buzzing courtesan, pushed each other and walked without ever changing place ".

The apartment named "of the Duke and the Duchess of Burgundy" 
It was situated between the Grand Vestibule and the apartment of Monseigneur.

These rooms were the main apartment of Abel Servien, who died there in his room on the ground floor in 1659.

When Monseigneur settled in Meudon in 1695 he gave this dwelling, next to his own, to Philip of Orleans (1640–1701), who occupied it until his death in 1701. The dwelling was then occupied by the Duke and the Duchess of Burgundy until their death in 1712.

Rooms on the ground floor 

The first floor contained large reception rooms, mainly the "Salon des Moures" and the gallery.

Salon des Maures 

Abel Servien created this oval room, centerpiece of the castle, which looks out on the parterre. This salon was built at the same time as the one at Château de Vaux-le-Vicomte was built for Nicolas Fouquet, and is similar, although slightly smaller in size. The cupola received no painted decoration. Gabriel Blanchard produced the twelve grisailles under the cornice, which the 1733 inventory describes: "In the same salon there are twelve paintings painted in grisaille representing the twelve months of the year by games of children, they are of damoiselet [faux, of Gabriel Blanchard], and can not raise the place being all maroufles, two feet high, 6 feet 5 inches wide.

Louvois placed in this salon twelve terms in Moorish and Moorish marble, eight of which are now in the Palace of Compiègne, transferred there at the very end of the 18th century. The minister also embellished the attic with seven paintings of flowers by Jean-Baptiste Monnoyer. The 1733 inventory of paintings of Meudon describes them:

 "a golden vase filled with all kinds of flowers, laid on a blue carpet embroidered with gold - the bottom of the picture is a sky."
 "a golden vase, or rather an agathic manner, whose handles are of gold, filled with all kinds of flowers, a carpet behind which is embroidered with gold, with two parrots, one blue and the other yellow."
 "A golden ornamented goderon vase filled with all kinds of flowers - a carpet behind embroidered gold with a red and green parrot".
 "A vase in the shape of a silver bowl filled with all sorts of flowers placed on a red carpet embroidered with gold with a peacock on the bowl."
 "A golden vase garnished with all kinds of flowers, among which a poppy falls with one of its leaves to the pedestal on which the vase is laid."
 "A golden vase laid on a foot-filled way filled with all kinds of flowers with a peacock behind the vase."
 "A gold and silver vase set on a blue and gold carpet whose lining is crimson with a monkey holding a fish."

The antechamber called games 

After the Salon des Maures a series of reception rooms served as rooms for games, and, as it were, for so-called "apartment" evenings, as at Versailles. The first room after the oval salon was square and had two windows on the side of the pit. Monseigneur the dauphin hung on the wall the tapestry of the History of the King, to please his father.

Game room 
The second room was similar to the first, and was also enriched with draperies, the northern bays being clogged for this purpose.

Salon du Petit Pont 

This corner room was one of the two salons framing the gallery. It had access to the "Petit Pont" (small bridge), which led directly to the high gardens. Alexander's porphyry bust was placed there.

Gallery of the old castle 

The gallery of Meudon had an area of 300 m², and the main room measured 40 meters long. There were also two drawing-rooms, the Salon du Petit Pont, and the Salon des Albane to the north.

The Albane salon 

This chamber ends the gallery, and it is the pendant of the Salon du Petit Pont, in symmetry. The salon is named for the painter Francesco Albani, for several oval-shaped canvases had been placed in the corners, copies reinterpreted from the master's work. The architecture of the room, with its niches adorned with mirrors and its domed ceiling, was inspired directly by the Cabinet of the medals of Louis XIV at Versailles.

The dauphin will place there the great bronzes of L'Algarde, Jupiter and Juno.

The apartment said of Louis XIV 

At the end of the 19th century, Louis XIV's apartment consisted of an antechamber, a royal chamber, a small passageway to the rear, That of a "cabinet of the mirrors of the King", which had a balcony allowing to admire the view on Paris.

Council antechamber 

This room without woodwork had three windows on the side of the floor and two French windows on the side of the courtyard allowing access to the balcony. The mantelpiece was of Campanian green marble.

The bedroom of Louis XIV in Meudon 

Above the fireplace in the king's chamber hung the original of "Charity" by Andrea del Sarto, then a copy of this painting. This work can be interpreted as an allegory of the transmission of royal power.

The cabinet of the mirrors of the king

Apartment of Madame de Maintenon 

Madame de Maintenon's apartment consisted of an antechamber, a bedroom, and a closet in the center of the east wing, as well as a balcony with a view of Paris. In the cabinet of Maintenon, there was a painting above the door of David and Abigail, painted by Louis de Boullogne.

Apartment of the Princess of Conti 

Afterwards, the apartment of the Princess of Conti followed and ended with another "Cabinet des mirroirs".

In the Princess room were two paintings by Antoine Coypel, Psyche discovering Sleeping Love, and Psyche abandoned by Love

In the adjoining cabinet was placed the painting entitled "Venus at the Forges of Lemnos", by the same painter. These three works were commissioned by Monseigneur for the apartment of his half-sister.

Chapel 

The chapel was completed at the end of 1702, on the plans of Jules Hardouin-Mansart. This construction, desired by Monseigneur, was aimed at by Louis XIV. This chapel follows the same model as the Royal Chapel at the Chateau of Versailles and the Royal Chapel of Versailles. However, the chapel of Meudon was completed a decade before that of Versailles. Like the latter, it has a barrel-vaulted nave ending in a cul-de-four above the sanctuary. Above the high altar is a large painting of Antoine Coypel, four meters high, eighty-five by three wide, which features the "Resurrection". Charles de La Fosse will model this composition to undertake the painting of the kiln furnace of the royal chapel of Versailles. Another painting by Coypel,  The Annunciation,  completes the set.

The arms carved above the tribune are royal weapons on the drawing projecting the chapel, but will eventually be realized according to the model of weapons delphinales. The architectural theorist, Jacques-François Blondel, cites as an example, with the chapels of the Châteaux de Sceaux and Clagny "Perfect models".

It will be destroyed between 1805 and 1808.

Chestnut Tree Wing 

The old "Cour des Offices", or "Basse Cour", was transformed by Monseigneur to create luxurious ceremonial rooms. The entire annex then took the name of "Wing of the Marronniers". The large reception rooms extend the width of the Terrasse des Marronniers. A small, luxurious apartment, the "Small Fresh Apartment", was also arranged behind these large rooms, no doubt for the Dauphin to receive his mistresses.

Small hanging gallery 

This gallery links to the communicating gallery which follows it perpendicularly. A large buffet painted by Fontenay completes the perspective of the small suspended gallery.

Communicating gallery 

This room is decorated with large paintings by François Desportes, commissioned for the chamber, and which would make the painter's success.

Large oval cabinet 

Also called the "Salon doré" (golden salon) where hung the "Triumph of Bacchus" by Bon Boullogne. The painting disappeared, but a preparatory drawing, preserved at the Albertina Museum (Vienna), and attributed to his brother Louis, allows us to understand what the composition of this work might look like.

Large corner cabinet 

The dauphin had some prestigious paintings in this room, including Renaud and Armide by the Dominiquin, and Moses saved from the waters by Nicolas Poussin. These canvases come from the royal collections.

Grand Salon 
It was the main room of the apartment of the chestnut trees, with an area of 100 m². The dauphin placed there other pictures from the royal collections, including two by Paul Veronese.

The dining room 

It was in this hall that the Bishop invited guests to dine.

The cabinet of the buffet 
This small room had two small basins, from which flowed streams of water.

"Small Fresh Apartment" 
Behind these large reception rooms, the Prince was given a "small fresh apartment", which consisted of an antechamber and another room. 
As well as a cabinet, it was enlivened by miniatures painted by Jean Cotelle the Elder, representing the gardens of Versailles.
These three rooms were all wooded at the Capucine, and adorned with the door-tops by Jean-Baptiste Belin.

Grotto of Meudon 

The cave of Meudon is the twin sister of this "House of the Theater" begun for Henry II in 1556 by De l'Orme and continued in 1559 by Primaticcio, a beautiful belvedere which, following additions towards the end of century, became the Chateau-Neuf of Saint-Germain-en-Laye.

"The Primatice painted for the Cardinal of Lorraine for his Chateau de Meudon a cave made up of several rooms, among others that of the pavilion where there were a number of frescoed figures in the ceiling; We destroyed this cave by building the new Castle in the time of Monseigneur the Dauphin ayeul du Roy. "

Giorgio Vasari speaks of the Grotto when he approaches Primaticius, who is its architect and, as it were, the chief decorator. There is also an interesting description of a traveler from the mid-17th century, preserved in the manuscripts of the Saint-Germain fonds, no. 944, as given by the "Lettres écrites de la Vendée":

"At two leagues from Paris is Meudon, where is seen in the wood an admirable and wonderful grotto, enriched with supports and damping of cut stone, small turrets turned and massed in the ass of a lamp, paved with a pavement Of porphire bastard, speckled with white, red, green, gray spots and of a hundred different colors, noughed by esgouts made with gargoyles and lyon muffles. There are columns, figures and statues of marble, grotesque paintings, compartimens and images of gold and azure, and other couleurs. The frontispiece has large fluted and roughened columns, trimmed with bases, Capital, architrave, friezes, cornices and moldings of good grace And just proportion: the vase and taillour sustained on the tests of virtues, approaching the average proportion of the colossi, enriched with leaves of acanthus and ursine branch to sustain the fullness of the stock, Very well conducted and completed; But the troubles have made there irreparable ruins, and especially to the pipes which have been broken".

It was demolished in 1705 to build the Château-Neuf in the same location.

Château-Neuf (new castle) 

We owe the plans of the Château-Neuf to the architect Jules Hardouin-Mansart. Philippe de Courcillon de Dangeau wrote May 21, 1706, that being at Marly, "the king worked in the morning with Mansart, who showed him the plans of the buildings that M. M. wants to make at Meudon at the place where the grotto is." Monseigneur wished this building to house the courtiers he received at Meudon, and the king aimed at the drawings made for Monseigneur. The building was erected on the site of the grotto, previously demolished in 1705.

A long corridor serves all the apartments: this was not unusual for the time. What was much more so was the systematization of the typical dwelling of the courtier, since the whole of the Château-Neuf can be compared to a "hotel" in the modern sense of the word.

After nearly two hundred years, a fire ravaged the building on January 31, 1871. The ruins were left to the inclement weather, and probably also looted, until 1879 when a law enacted the choice of Meudon as an observatory. Restoration of the ruins was then begun by the architect Constant Moyaux, saving from destruction what remained of the castle, especially the two lower floors, less damaged by the fire.

The upper vestibule 

The chateau was reached by the upper vestibule on the forest side. It was Italian, pierced by an opening, which made it possible to clear its space. The door-tops were carved with children representing the four seasons, the representation of which is preserved by photographs of plaster models, molded on the originals (Vente Sardou).

The guardroom 

This central room overlooked the flower beds through three rectangular windows (preserved bays). At its creation, it was lined with molded woodwork. On the mantelpiece was a copy of the David of Dominiquin. Louis XIV was particularly fond of this painting. Two paintings were ordered from the side exits: 1. a dog, and a greyhound, on the front in the middle of the game, scattered on the ground ducks partridges beccasses and hare in the middle A game-bag has a tree "; 2. a "hare that is attached to a tree by its left foot, on the left a dog at the feet of which are four partridges and a pheasant, on the front of the table a gun and its supply".

The first antechamber 

In 1775, the piece is described in the following way: 
"Antechamber or dining room in suitte. Room illuminated by two windows in the Levant, paneling of apui, cornice carved. Chimney of white marble vene (...) Two paintings above the doors, painted on canvas. One represents a golden vase, set on a marble pedestal, with a garland falling in festoons, and fruits. On the pedestal are limes, grenades and grapes, crimson curtain and sky background, the other represents a golden bronze vaze, surrounded by a garland of flowers posed on a fullte of green marble, beside is a vase Of silver overturned with a figure of a woman in the form of an anchor. These two paintings are from Fontenay ". The middle of the room is adorned with "a table of black mastic with flowers and birds in the natural".

The second antechamber 

When the Château-Neuf was finished in 1709, on avait disposé two paintings ordered from Fontenay, comme pour toutes les autres pièces de l'appartement, ce qui uniformisait le décor, à savoir :
"A golden vase with two handles, surrounded by a garland of fruit, placed on a table of porphire, which is furnished with grapes; On the right, a basket filled with Italian grapes, cucumber, pomegranate and flowers; on the left, a crimson curtain, behind which are several golden basins, one of which is surrounded by a garland of flowers."

A pyramid of fruit resting on a marble table, on which is a melon hung next to a pomegranate; On the right, on the same table, an orange tree in a porcelain vase; On the same table, on the left, a large golden vase surrounded by a garland of flowers, at the foot of which is another silver vase reversed, a golden dish, a corner of which is hidden by a purple curtain of the same dimensions as the preceding.

The inventory of 1775 indicates that it is a:

"Room illuminated by a cross in the Levant, paneled high, scultée, gilded and varnished on wood, cornice in plaster scultée and gilded idem. The chimney of green-campan. (...) Two paintings above the doors, painted on canvases, each of width on height. The first one represents Apollo and Daphne, this god pursues this nymph who takes refuge in the arms of his father's river Peneus. The second represents the triumph of Acis and Galathea. The first of these paintings is by Antoine Coypel, the second is Corneille (the elder)".

Monseigneur's Parade Chamber 

The 1775 inventory indicates the following decorations in the parade chamber::
The room is illuminated by two windows on the east, wooden panelling, varnished and gilded on wood, sculpted and gilded cornice, large alcove supported on pilasters. Two paintings above the doors, painted on canvas, each 4 feet 9 inches wide by 3 feet 3 inches high. One represents a golden vase filled with different flowers, set on a marble ledge. In the background are two columns surrounded by garlands of flowers. The other represents a golden vase with a handle filled with different flowers, placed on a stone stack, beside another alabaster vase. And on the other side an end of drapery that falls over the edge of the plinth. These two paintings are by Fontenay. [In the margin] In this room, under the mirrored piers, are two long green Campan marble tables supported on gilded and sculpted console feet.

Originally, the alcove was decorated with 12 "grotesque" tapestries designed by Claude Audran III for Gobelins, nine of which still exist. The inventory of Crown furniture is as follows:
"A three-piece basse-lisse tapestry of wool and silk, enhanced with gold and silver, manufactured in Paris at the Gobelins Manufactory and designed by Audran. It represents the divinities who preside over the twelve months of the year on twelve bands of daffodil, under grotesque porticoes of different shapes, accompanied by the attributes of each divinity, grotesques, grooves and ornaments, with the sign of the month. By other narrower stripes, with a purple background, laden with mosaics, and the figures of Louis of France, all in silver, the top and bottom borders like narrow bands, with silver shells and dolphins, the curtain containing 9 aunes 1/8 of course on 3 aunes ¼ high, made expressly for the Monseigneur's chamber, in his apartment in the new castle in Meudon."

Here is the list of the gods attached to the months grotesques:
"January under the protection of Juno"
"February under the protection of Neptune"
"March under the protection of the god Mars and Minerva"
"April under the protection of Venus"
"May under the protection of Apollo"
"June under the protection of Mercury"
"July under the protection of Jupiter"
"August under the protection of Ceres"
"September under the protection of Vulcan"
"October under the protection of Minerva and Mars"
"November under the protection of Diane"
"December under the protection of Vesta"

Gallery

The Orangeries 
In order to protect the orange trees from the cold during the winter, two main orangeries were built at Meudon, the most important of which is the Château-Vieux.

Orangery of the old castle 
Traditionally, in French castles since the 18th century, an orangery is a utilitarian building that retains a strong element of monumental composition, constituted here by the terrace, the Castle-Vieux and the loggia. Its dimensions determine the magnitude of the great perspective that extends from the castle to the plateau of Villacoublay.

The orangery was probably built between 1655 and 1659 by the architect Louis Le Vau, for the owner of the estate Abel Servien, superintendent of finance under Louis XIV. Open to the south through eight high windows on either side of a monumental entrance, the orangery is intended to house the park's orange trees during the cold season. During the summer, orange trees were displayed on its floor around a rectangular basin, as well as on the grounds of the castle and cave. The orangery extends eastward with a crude bastion.

Renovated several times in the 19th century, then abandoned until 1980, the parterre of the orangery was restored between 1980 and 1984 to its 17th-century appearance.

The Orangery of the new castle 
It was built at the same time as the Château-Neuf, between 1706 and 1708. It was demolished during the reign of Louis XVI.

The greenhouse below the Orangerie du Château-Vieux 
A third building was used for the conservation of shrubs during the winter. The "greenhouse" was located immediately below the bastion of the Orangery of the old castle in Meudon. There is still the wall at the bottom, enclosed, as well as a buttress. The rest of this building adjoins the back of the garden of the Museum of Art and History of Meudon.

Stables 

The new commons still exist today, perfectly preserved. They are located at the entrance of the estate, at the top of the avenue to the castle.
They were built by extending an earlier building, the kennel of Louvois.

The three inner courtyards connect through a clear central passage for horses. The stables have only one floor, attic, so as not to obstruct the view of Paris from the Pond of Bel Air above. Abundant dwellings for the castle staff furnish this floor.

All the stalls were rebuilt in the 19th century. Some still exist.

Today all of these buildings are assigned to the Observatoire de Paris, which prevents access to all visitors.
The commons have a total area of 5,000 m² (2,500 m² on each of the two levels).
To this must be added also the area of the adjoining guard-house, of 850 m².

The gardens 

The gardens of Meudon were of great magnificence. There were high gardens and low gardens, not to mention the Grande Perspective. The Meudon Way describes the itinerary for discovering Meudon's points of view at the end of the reign of Louis XIV. They are classified as "slope gardens".

The Great Perspective 

The Great Perspective is the monumental axis that organizes all the area of Meudon. It is perfectly rectilinear over a distance of 3.5 km, despite the unevenness of the terrain. It was created on both sides of the Château-Vieux, a place occupied from the beginning.

At its apogee, at the beginning of the eighteenth century, it was composed as follows (from north to south):
 Avenue du château (planted with four rows of trees)
 First ditches
 Front yard (on the right, terrace of the chestnut trees)
 Second ditches (buried under the terrace)
 Courtyard of the Château-Vieux, known as the royal court
 The Château-Vieux (destroyed, cellars preserved)
 The floor, designed by André Le Nôtre (destroyed)
 The Orangerie, of Louis Le Vau, with a circular basin
 The parterre of the Orangerie, with a rectangular basin
 Lawn, with a white marble statue, unidentified
 The basin known as the "Grand Carré" (destroyed)
 New lawn, shorter than first
 The water grid, with 10 jets of water (destroyed)
 Other lawn, longer
 The pond of Chalais (on the right, the carp channel)
 The Green Carpet
 The pavilion of Trivaux (under Louis XVI) (destroyed)
The axis ended at an alley drawn on the plateau of Trivaux.

Low gardens 

The low gardens were mainly developed by Louvois, and then embellished by Monseigneur and Louis XIV. Their different levels and the different points of view made the charm, as well as the presence of many water bodies and thousands of topiaries. It was accessed from the "Grand Carré" basin:
 The floor of the Oval;
 On the left, the channel of the shadow;
 On the right, the half-moon;
 The wood of Guenegaud, with its pavilion;
 The basin of the octagon;
 Below, the "play of M. Le Nostre", framed by two cascades;
 In the background, the vertugadin, going up.
 On the left, Cleopatra's grove;
 The Arthelon canal
 The Arthelon waterfall
 The chestnut grove
 The Small Grotto of the Hotel Courtin
 The parterre of the Hôtel Courtin

High gardens 

The area of the high gardens is nearly three times larger than that of the low gardens. The hold of these high gardens is still preserved today, occupied mainly by the Paris Observatory. The gardens consisted of a labyrinthine network of walkways, embellished with numerous bodies of water. Unlike the low gardens, the high gardens were mainly flat, since they were planted on the hill of Meudon. There were:
 The parterre of the Grotto, then parterre of the Château-Neuf in 1708
 The Cradles, simplified in 1708
 The floor of the Globe
 The parterre des Bois
 The Calotte
 The Parasol
 The Gladiator
 The Grove of the Cloisters
 The Bel Air Basin
 The gardens of Montafilan, with the stone cabinet
 The bastion of the Capuchins, which served as a point of view on Paris and Saint-Cloud.

Park and ponds 

The park of Meudon extended as far as Chaville, and thence reached that of Versailles. The elevation of the terrain, the dense forest, the numerous ponds, the great plains situated on the heights are the main features of this park in the 17th and 18th centuries. These included:
 The pond of the Garenne
 The Triveau pond
 The pond of the Fountains 
 The pond of Vilbon
 The Renault Fosse pond
 The Tronchet pond
 The old tank
 The new tank
 The leg of Oye
 The farm of Vilbon, with the watermills

The pond called Meudon was not created until the 20th century.

The historical library of the city of Versailles preserves a manuscript of the reservoirs of Meudon, embossed with the arms of the Grand Dauphin, dating about 1700.

The village of Meudon 

The village of Meudon was made up of numerous hôtels and properties, the largest of which belonged to persons linked to the owners of the castle. These included:
 Saint Martin's Church, (preserved)
 Hotel Henri du Plessis-Guénégaud (demolished)
 Hotel Bellon, (demolished)
 Hotel Richer, (preserved)
 Hotel Tourmont, (preserved)
 hôtel of the Countess of Verrue (preserved)
 Castle of Fleury (demolished)
 The country house of Madame de La Fayette in Fleury
 Folly by Jean-Jacques Huvé, (preserved)
 Villa of Jean-François Jacqueminot
 Gallyot hotel in Fleury, (demolished)
 House of Pierre-Joseph Redouté
 House of Bastide, then house of Bailly. (Demolished)
 Convent of the Capuchin Friars Minor, the first of this order installed in France by the care of the Cardinal of Lorraine

All these buildings and gardens were visible from the castle or its gardens.

References

Sources
 
 Fiske Kimball, The Creation of the Rococo, (Philadelphia Museum of Art) 1943.

External links
 The Web page about the "Château de Meudon"  
 Châteaux de Meudon 
 Engravings of the Château de Meudon.
 Construction of the Observatoire de Paris at Meudon. 

Meudon
Demolished buildings and structures in France
Châteaux with formal gardens in France
Former buildings and structures in France
Astronomical observatories in France
Meudon
Architecture in France
Monuments historiques of Île-de-France
Ruined castles in France
Ancien Régime French architecture
Aerostats